Cloghran is a civil parish in the ancient barony of Coolock  in Ireland. It consists of eight townlands: Baskin, Cloghran, Clonshagh, Corballis, Middletown, Springhill, Stockhole, Toberbunny. According to Lewis' 1837 survey,   Much of the land in the parish lies between Dublin Airport to the west and the M1 motorway to the east.

References

From the Placename Database of Ireland